Antiophlebia is a genus of moths of the family Noctuidae.

Species
Antiophlebia bourgognei  Laporte, 1975
Antiophlebia bracteata  Felder, 1874
Antiophlebia griveaudi  Viette, 1966

References
Natural History Museum Lepidoptera genus database

Catocalinae